Subepithelial mucinous corneal dystrophy (SMCD) is a rare form of corneal dystrophy. It was first described in 1993 by Feder et al. Anterior to Bowman layer, deposits of glycosaminoglycan were detected and identified as chondroitin-4-sulfate and dermatan sulfate.

References

External links 

Disorders of sclera and cornea